Zahid Fazal (born November 10, 1973) is a former Pakistani cricketer who played in 9 Tests and 19 ODIs from 1990 to 1995. A right-handed batsman, he made his first-class debut in February 1990 for Pakistan Automobiles Corporation, scoring a half-century in his only innings. He made his international debut nine months later, playing in the third ODI against the touring New Zealand side. His highest ODI score is 98* (retired hurt) against India at Sharjah on 25-10-1991 in the final of Wills Trophy. He also played in the 1992 Cricket World Cup where Pakistan emerged as winners.

His final international match was the third Test against Sri Lanka in September 1995, when he scored 23 and 1. He completed his international career with a Test batting average of 18.00, and an ODI average of 23.20. He continued to play domestic cricket until 2004, and retired with first-class and List A averages in excess of thirty.

References

1973 births
Living people
Pakistan One Day International cricketers
Cricketers at the 1992 Cricket World Cup
Pakistan Test cricketers
Pakistan International Airlines cricketers
Pakistani cricketers
Pakistan Automobiles Corporation cricketers
Cricketers from Sialkot